Mayals is an electoral ward and suburb of Swansea, Wales. It is located about 6 kilometers west of Swansea City Centre. Mayals is considered a part of the larger district of Mumbles, along with the nine other settlements within the community council region. In 2022, Mayals had a population of 2,600, compared with the 2011 census, at which point Mayals had a population of 2,676. Mayals borders the areas of Sketty, Killay, Fairwood, Bishopston, and West Cross. The majority of Mayals is situated within the Gower Area of Outstanding Natural Beauty, which was the first AONB to be established in 1956.

The suburb of Mayals is a mostly residential area, containing Clyne Gardens, Clyne Golf Club, and Mayals Primary School. Clyne Gardens is a 19-hectare botanical garden, which has an 18th-century castle, Clyne Castle, a Japanese-style bridge and adjoining pond, and a large gazebo. The gardens also contain an extensive plant collection, with over 2,000 different plants including over 800 rhododendrons for which the gardens are renowned. Clyne Gardens is popular with local dog owners, with many walking their dogs within the gardens daily.

There is another park within the Mayals area, known locally as West Cross Woodland, despite being situated within the Mayals area. The park is next to Mayals Primary School, and across the street from the West Cross Co-op store, a former pub which was refitted in late 2019. This park contains a small play facility for children, and a small woodland. This park is considerably smaller than Clyne Gardens.

Education 
Mayals houses its own primary school, Mayals Primary School, which takes in students aged 4-11, or Nursery, Infants, and Juniors. There are 247 students as of 2022. The school was last inspected by Estyn in 2022, and are currently under review.

Mayals is located within the Bishopston Comprehensive School catchment area. Students within the area are also given the option of post 16 education, with Gower College Swansea being in close proximity, along with Swansea University for undergraduate and postgraduate students.

Demographics 
The overall population in the Mayals ward according to the 2011 census was 2,676.

They had the following ethnic breakdown in 2011

Local Election Results 
Since 1997 Mayals has been a single-member ward for the purposes of City and County of Swansea Council elections.

2022 

Chris Evans was the first Green Party candidate to gain a seat in the Swansea Council elections, winning the seat from the Conservatives by 125 votes.

2017

2012

2008 

Originally elected as a Liberal Democrat in 2004, Rene Harwood Kinzett joined the Conservatives prior to the 2008 election.

2004

1999

1995

References

Districts of Swansea
Mumbles